Heidrun or Heiðrún is a female name originally from Norse mythology.

People
 Heidrun Bluhm (born 1958), German politician 
 Heidrun Breier (born 1971), Romanian-German-Chilean actress; see Las 2 Carolinas
 Heidrun Gerzymisch (born 1944), German Translation scholar and professor
 Heidrun Hartmann (1942–2016), German botanist
 Heidrun Huwyler (born 1942), Swiss Post-Impressionist painter
 Heidrun Mohr-Mayer (1941–2014), German jeweller and philanthropist

Other 
 Heidrun oil field, an oil and gas field discovered in 1985 in the Norwegian Sea
 Heidrun, a Danish Unmanned Aerial Vehicles (UAV) platform produced by Sky-Watch

Feminine given names